The Serbian Women's Super League ( / Super Liga Žene) is the top level women's football league of Serbia. It was founded in 2006. The team with the most championships to date is ŽFK Spartak Subotica with five titles.

Until 2013/14 the top-level league was called Prva Ženska Liga (First League). For that season the Super Liga was created on top of the league system. The second-level league is now the prva liga.

Current Format
Until 2012/13 the league played a double round robin. The winner was the champion of Serbia.

From 2013/14 onwards, with only eight teams in the league there are two stages. In the first stage, each team plays the other teams two times for a total of 14 matches. After that, the top four teams play a Championship play-off and the bottom four a relegation play-off (play-out). Matches against the teams from the other play-off group are deleted from the standings, thus only matches against teams from the same play-off group make the final standings. In each play-off teams meet each other twice again for a total of 20 matches per season, of which 12 are taken into account for the final standings. The winning team of the championship play-off is Serbian champion and qualifies for a spot in the UEFA Women's Champions League. The bottom placed team of the play-out is relegated to the second league. When tied on points, better results with tied teams decide the rank.

2020/2021 teams 
Crvena Zvezda
Kanjiža
Kolubara
Mašinac PZP
Požarevac
Radnički
Sloga Zemun
Spartak Subotica
Vojvodina
Zemun

Serbian Champions

The success of clubs

Champions former YU republics
The women's national football league started to be played in the 1974–75 season, then still part of Yugoslavia. After the split of Yugoslavia in 1991, the league continued in the remaining state of FR Yugoslavia, that was renamed in 2002/03 to Serbia and Montenegro, until the split of the two in 2006. The succeeding league is the one of Serbia.

SFR Yugoslavia
1974/75 Železničar Subotica
1975/76 ŽNK Zagreb
1976/77 ŽNK Zagreb
1977/78 ŽNK Zagreb
1978/79 Sloga Zemun
1979/80 Sloga Zemun
1980/81 Sloboda '78 Zagreb
1981/82 Maksimir Zagreb
1982/83 ŽFK Željezničar Sarajevo
1983/84 Mašinac Niš
1984/85 Mašinac Niš
1985/86 Mašinac Niš
1986/87 Mašinac Niš
1987/88 Mašinac Niš
1988/89 Mašinac Niš
1989/90 Mašinac Niš
1990/91 Maksimir Zagreb

FR Yugoslavia
1991/92 Mašinac Classic Niš
1992/93 Mašinac Classic Niš
1993/94 Sloga Zemun
1994/95 Mašinac Classic Niš
1995/96 Mašinac Classic Niš
1996/97 Mašinac Classic Niš
1997/98 Mašinac Classic Niš
1998/99 Mašinac Classic Niš
1999/00 Mašinac Classic Niš
2000/01 Mašinac Classic Niš
2001/02 Mašinac Classic Niš

Serbia-Montenegro
2002/03 Mašinac Classic Niš
2003/04 Mašinac Niš
2004/05 Mašinac Niš
2005/06 Mašinac Niš

Titles by clubs

References

External links
 Official Site
 League at UEFA.com
 League at women.soccerway.com

Top level women's association football leagues in Europe
1
Women
Women's sports leagues in Serbia
2006 establishments in Serbia
Sports leagues established in 2006
Professional sports leagues in Serbia